Tanpopo 1 is the first album from the Japanese pop idol group Tanpopo. It was released March 31, 1999 with the catalog number EPCE-5017.

It contains at least one version of three A-sides, and six new songs.

Track listing
 
 
 
 "Motto (Album Mix)"
 
 
 "One Step"

External links
  entry on the Hello! Project official website
 Tanpopo 1 Up-Front Works

1999 albums
Tanpopo albums